Win Green Down at  in south-western Wiltshire, England is a  biological Site of Special Scientific Interest, notified in 1971.

There are extensive views, with Bournemouth, the Isle of Wight, Salisbury, Glastonbury Tor, the Mendips, the Quantocks and Milk Hill all visible in clear conditions. It is classed as a Marilyn, and is a landmark due to the clump of trees on the high point. The parent peak is Long Knoll.

References 

 English Nature citation sheet for the site (accessed 8 August 2006)
 http://www.ukhillwalking.com/logbook/hill.php?id=14024
 Mapping: OS Explorer 118 (1:25 000), OS Landranger 184 (1:50 000)

External links
 English Nature website (SSSI information)

Sites of Special Scientific Interest in Wiltshire
Sites of Special Scientific Interest notified in 1971
Hills of Wiltshire